The Boerenbond (Dutch, or ; literally "Farmers' League") is a professional association of farmers active in the Flemish and German-speaking communities of Belgium. Founded in 1890 and based in Leuven, the Boerenbond is an organisation promotes the interests of farmers working within its regions of activity and has historically been closely associated with Catholic political parties.

In the 1920s, it had 100,000 members divided into 1,050 guilds, and it was "intimately connected with the Catholic church". In politics, it was "an important part of the strong Catholic party".

The organisation is politically right-wing and has historically been influential within national Christian Democratic politics. Today it has particular prominence within the Christen-Democratisch en Vlaams (CD&V) and Christlich Soziale Partei (CSP) parties.

The Boerenbond competes with the rival Algemeen Boerensyndicaat (ABS) organisation.

List of presidents
1890-1925: Joris Helleputte
1925-36: Victor Parein
1936-40: Gilbert Mullie
1940-49: Alfons Conix
1949-61: Gilbert Mullie
1961-64: Maurits Van Hemelrijck
1964-77: Constant Boon
1977-81: André Dequae
1981-92: Jan Hinnekens
1992-95: Robert Eeckloo
1995-2008: Noël Devisch
2008-15: Piet Vanthemsche
2015–22: Sonja De Becker
2022-present: Lode Ceyssens

References

Further reading

External links

Official website
The Rural Movement in Flanders, 1960-1990 at Katholieke Universiteit Leuven
The Flemish rural movement on the move (1960's – 1970's)

Agricultural organisations based in Belgium
Leuven
Farmers' organizations
Organizations established in 1890
1890 establishments in Belgium
Politics of Flanders